Liar, Liar is a 1993 Canadian drama television film starring Vanessa King as a girl who accuses her father (Art Hindle) of molestation, only to have no one in her family believe her. The film originally aired on January 24, 1993 on CBC Television in Canada.

It aired under the title Liar, Liar: Between Father and Daughter on CBS on June 22, 1993 in the United States. It was also released under the title Daddy's Little Secret in the United Kingdom.

Plot
11-year-old Kelly Farrow (Vanessa King) is a girl with a history of telling tall tales and bullying her younger siblings.  One night, she locks her younger brother Patrick (Joel Palmer) in the bathroom, which terrifies him greatly, and is punished by her father Gil (Art Hindle), who supposedly "spanks" her.  Afterwards, Kelly vows that he will never hurt her again.  At school the next day, she hears a classmate tell a story about a relative who accused her father of molestation and had him sent to jail; this gives her an idea.  Kelly tells her teacher Mrs. Hildebrant (Wendy Van Riesen) that her father has been sexually abusing her. Kelly speaks with the authorities, and they arrange to have her father arrested.

The accusation and subsequent trial creates distance between Kelly and her family; mother Mary (Rosemary Dunsmore) and sisters Jean "Nini" (Ashleigh Aston Moore) and Christina "Chrissy" (Janne Mortil) doubt Kelly, given her history of lying and bullying.  The only family member who believes her is Patrick.  Gil's attorney Helen Browne (Susan Hogan) picks her case apart in court by confirming that Kelly is technically still a virgin (as her hymen has not been broken), and by casting doubt on the medical evidence of abuse.  People come to believe that Kelly is lying because her father is known to be strict in his punishments, including prosecutor Susan Miori (Kate Nelligan), and she struggles to get people to believe her.

When older sister Chrissy tries to talk Kelly into dropping the case, Kelly confronts her with her knowledge of a secret that Chrissy herself has completely repressed her memories of: throughout her childhood and adolescence, Gil abused her, and switched his incestuous attentions to Kelly after Chrissy left home.  As they are talking, Patrick becomes hysterically frightened after being left alone in the bathroom with Chrissy's husband Keith (Roman Podhora).  Shell-shocked, Chrissy realizes that not only was Kelly telling the truth, but that Patrick has also suffered at the hands of their father, which is where his fear of being locked in the bathroom stems from.

After confronting her father, Chrissy defends her sister by telling the court of her own abuse, which parallels Kelly's account.  The next day, Gil is convicted and sentenced to prison for 10 months and probation for 2 years.  The judge apologizes to Kelly, stating that age is not a factor in determining honesty.  He goes on to state that he wants a full investigation into Chrissy's allegations, and into Gil's relations with Nini and Patrick.  While Mary and Nini are shocked and devastated at the situation, Kelly walks out with Chrissy and Patrick, relieved that she was finally believed.

Cast
 Art Hindle as Gil Farrow
 Vanessa King as Kelly Farrow
 Janne Mortil as Christina "Chrissy" Farrow-Berezuk
 Rosemary Dunsmore as Mary Farrow
 Ashleigh Aston Moore as Jean "Nini" Farrow
 Joel Palmer as Patrick Farrow
 Kate Nelligan as Susan Miori
 Roman Podhora as Keith Berezuk
 Michelle St. John as Janice
 Wendy Van Reisen as Mrs. Hildebrandt
 Kaj-Erik Eriksen as Jonah
 Susan Hogan as Helen Browne
 Selina Hanuse as Female student

Reception
Liar, Liar is known both for its cast inclusion of Selina Hanuse (her only role other than as Hannah Kenidi on North of 60 prior to her death in a car accident at the age of 17), and also for its numerous Gemini Award nominations. The Los Angeles Times praised the film, with critic Ray Loynd noting that the film's candid flashbacks to traumatic childhood sexual abuse might be "unnerving", while also stating, "a Canadian production (which premiered in Canada on the CBC last January), the movie is perhaps the most candid and most suspenseful parent/child molestation story aired to date on U.S. television." Tony Scott of Daily Variety was slightly more critical but still generally positive, stating, "if the outcome's not entirely satisfactory, the telefilm has much to say about truth and buried anger."

Award nominations

References

External links
 
 
 
 Review by Ken Tucker at EW.com

1993 television films
1993 drama films
1993 films
CBC Television original films
English-language Canadian films
Films scored by Fred Mollin
Films about child abuse
Films shot in Vancouver
Canadian drama television films
Films directed by Jorge Montesi
1990s Canadian films